Central Bus Station, popularly known as Central Bus Stand, is one of the bus termini of Trichy, located near Cantonment, the other being the Chatram Bus Stand.

Being a major transit point in the central region of the state, it experiences heavy traffic of about 2,200 buses daily. These buses serve about one lakh (100,000) passengers every day.

Services 

The terminus handles Mofussil intercity bus services, express buses, highway buses and sleeper buses at scheduled hours as it serves as a transit point for travelling in any direction round the clock. The terminus is well utilised by buses belonging to the SETC, Karnataka State Road Transport Corporation, Kerala State Road Transport Corporation and numerous private operators.

It also serves TNSTC's transit buses for Srirangam, Thiruverrumpoor, SRM Medical Institutions, Uraiyur, Tiruchchirappalli junction, Tiruchchirappalli Airport, Rockfort, K. K. Nagar, HAPP, Keeranur, TNPL, BIT, Ponmalai, Prattiyur, Manikandam, Edamalaipatti Pudur, Anna University, Chathiram bus stand, Vayalur, Kottapattu, Panchapur, Mannachanallur, Paal pannai, Ariyamangalam, Thuvakudi, NIT, Thuraiyur and Viralimalai(via Kallikudi Integrated Market) just outside the terminus on the Rockins road.

Expansion 
As a result, the town bus terminus was moved just outside the station to Rockins road with new bus shelters. To accommodate the evergrowing movement of mofussil buses, two additional platforms were extended up to  thereby increasing the number of bays from 55 to 77. Also in addition, a multi-storeyed two-wheeler parking lot inside the bus station was constructed.

Developments 
Due to the strategic location of the terminus within the city and the city within the state, it is quite often to witness heavy traffic particularly during festivals. Ever since during the 1990s a proposal for a new integrated bus stand was mooted under the scheme of Integrated Urban Development Programme, small and medium towns (Municipalities and Town Panchayats). Again sites at Devadhanam, Corporation garbage dump at Ariyamangalam and Defence land in Mannarpuram were suggested. For the  site at Devadhanam, the Tamil Nadu Pollution Control Board refused to issue a mandatory No Objection certificate due to the proximity of the Cauvery river and a possible pollution in future and so as the farmers and residents of the area opposed the move for same reason and went to court. Yet the  defence land at Mannarpuram was favoured due to its proximity to Tiruchirappalli Junction and within the centre of city, but slow response from Ministry of Defence keeps the issue lingering. The fate were same for the site at Ramji Nagar, near NH 45 and Kottapattu, near NH 210. The committee which was constituted by the court in 2006 to find an amicable and consensual decision, composed of officials from Revenue, Town and Country Planning, Corporation, Tamil Nadu Pollution Control Board and the Public Works Department, started the process afresh during mid-2011.

Connections to other modes of transport 

See also 
 Central Bus Station, Kumbakonam
 Transport in Tiruchirappalli
 Transport in Tamil Nadu

References

External links 
 Tiruchirappalli City Municipal Corporation
 TNSTC Online Ticket Booking
 KSRTC Online Ticket Booking

Bus stations in Tiruchirappalli
Transport infrastructure completed in 1970